Sofia Cantore (born 30 September 1999) is an Italian professional footballer who plays as forward for Serie A club Juventus FC and the Italy women's national team.

Club career 
Cantore helped Fiammamonza gain promotion to Serie B in the 2016–17 season.

In August 2017, she moved to Juventus. On 12 March 2018, Cantore scored her first goal for Juventus in a 2–0 away win against Verona. She scored four goals in 19 matches in the 2017–18 season, also winning the 2017–18 league title. On 9 June 2018, she suffered a knee injury which prevented her to play in the 2018 UEFA Women's Under-19 Championship. The injury also affected the following season in which she only played one match.

In July 2019, she moved to Hellas Verona on loan, where she scored three goals in 14 appearances. In July 2020, she moved on loan to Florentia, scoring nine goals in 22 appearances. On 9 July 2021, she was loaned to Sassuolo. She fractured her tibula on 18 February 2022, ending her season prematurely.

International career 
On 1 December 2020, Cantore made her senior debut with Italy in a 0–0 draw against Denmark.

International goals

Honours 
Fiammamonza
 Serie C: 2016–17

'''Juventus
 Serie A: 2017–18, 2018–19
 Coppa Italia: 2018–19
 Supercoppa Italiana runner-up: 2018

References

External links 
 

Living people
1999 births
Footballers from Lombardy
Sportspeople from Lecco
Italian women's footballers
Women's association football forwards
ASD Fiammamonza 1970 players
Juventus F.C. (women) players
Hellas Verona Women players
Florentia San Gimignano S.S.D. players
U.S. Sassuolo Calcio (women) players
Serie A (women's football) players
Italy women's international footballers
21st-century Italian women